Wivine Mumba Matipa is a DRC politician. From 2012 to 2015 she was Minister of Justice in the government of Joseph Kabila. In May 2017 she was announced as Minister of the Portfolio in Kabila's inclusive interim government.

References

Year of birth missing (living people)
Living people
Women government ministers of the Democratic Republic of the Congo
Justice ministers
21st-century Democratic Republic of the Congo women politicians
21st-century Democratic Republic of the Congo politicians